Pilopleura is a genus of flowering plants belonging to the family Apiaceae.

Its native range is Central Asia.

Species:

Pilopleura goloskokovii 
Pilopleura tordyloides

References

Apioideae
Apioideae genera